Erik Nielson may refer to:

Erik Nielson (academic), academic and expert in the use of rap music as evidence in criminal trials
Erik Nielson (footballer) (born 1996), Cape Verdean footballer

See also
 Erik Nielsen (disambiguation)